Raúl Agustín Armando (born 23 June 1965) is an Argentine football manager and former player who played as a defender. He is the current manager of Colombian club Atlético Bucaramanga.

Playing career
He retired with the latter in 1997, aged 32.

Managerial career
After working in the youth categories of his main club Unión de Santa Fe, Armando was named Frank Darío Kudelka's assistant at Patronato in 2004.

He continued to follow Kudelka in the following years, being his assistant at Instituto, Huracán, Talleres de Córdoba, Universidad de Chile and Newell's Old Boys.

In October 2021, Armando joined Claudio Spontón's staff at Platense. He returned to managerial duties on 25 April of the following year, being named in charge of Sportivo Belgrano.

Armando left Sportivo Belgrano on 29 November 2022, and moved to Colombia on 5 December after being named Atlético Bucaramanga manager.

References

External links

1965 births
Living people
Sportspeople from Santa Fe Province
Argentine footballers
Argentine Primera División players
Unión de Santa Fe footballers
San Martín de Tucumán footballers
Club Atlético Lanús footballers
Club Atlético Patronato footballers
Argentine football managers
Atlético Bucaramanga managers
Argentine expatriate football managers
Expatriate football managers in Colombia